Bordères-sur-l'Échez (literally Bordères on the Échez) is a commune in the Hautes-Pyrénées department in southwestern France. It is approximately 6 km northwest of Tarbes.

Population
The inhabitants of the commune are known as Borderais, and has the nickname named Les Cabilats.

International relations
The commune of Bordères-sur-l'Échez was twinned with:
 Alcanar, Spain

See also
Communes of the Hautes-Pyrénées department
Michèle Artigue, mathematician, born in Bordères-sur-l'Échez in 1946

References

Communes of Hautes-Pyrénées